Agantuker Pore (lit. "After The Stranger") is a 2016 Bengali drama film will be directed by Orko Sinha and produced by Dag Creative Media. The film will be a stand-alone sequel to Satyajit Ray's last film Agantuk. Mamata Shankar, Deepankar De and Dhritiman Chatterjee will reprise their roles from the previous film. Actor Abir Chatterjee will play the role of adult Satyaki. Payel Sarkar and Tridha Chowdhury will be seen in important roles.

Cast
Abir Chatterjee as Satyaki
Payel Sarkar
Mamata Shankar 
Deepankar De
Dhritiman Chatterjee as Prithwish Sen Gupta
Tridha Chowdhury

References

Films set in Kolkata
Bengali-language Indian films
2010s Bengali-language films